The 1912–13 SK Rapid Wien season was the 15th season in club history.

Squad

Squad and statistics

Squad statistics

Fixtures and results

League

References

1912-13 Rapid Wien Season
Rapid
Austrian football championship-winning seasons